The Frankenstein Syndrome (originally titled The Prometheus Project) is a 2010 American science fiction-horror film written and directed by Sean Tretta.  Scott Anthony Leet stars as a murdered security guard who is reanimated by a research institute in the tradition of Mary Shelley's novel Frankenstein.  It showed in film festivals in 2010 and then was released directly to DVD.

Plot 
Researchers conduct secret and illegal experiments using stem cells. The researchers accidentally discover a serum derived from these stem cells capable of reviving dead cellular tissue. When a security guard, David Doyle, threatens to sue the research company and wants to leave the project, he is promptly murdered and used as a test subject.

David returns to life but, in the style of The Reanimator, David is not the same man he once was. Not only is his personality and memory changed, but he is seen to have acquired psychic and telekinetic powers, as well as increased strength and aggression. David begins to act out against the researchers, who all at once are his captors, murderers, and creators.

Cast 
 Ed Lauter as Dr. Walton
 Louis Mandylor as Marcus
 Tiffany Shepis as Elizabeth Barnes
 Scott Anthony Leet as David Doyle
 Maya Stojan as Dr. Walton's Nurse

Production 
Dread Central reported that it was in post-production in March 2010.

Release 
American World Pictures purchased the film in October 2010 and retitled it to The Frankenstein Syndrome.
MTI Home Video released it on July 5, 2011.

Reception 
Darryl Loomis of DVD Verdict wrote, "The Frankenstein Syndrome isn't a great film, but for those into both Mary Shelley's beautiful novel and independent horror, you can do a whole lot worse than this."  Bill Gibron of PopMatters rated it 7/10 stars and wrote, "While some of the subplots and a few of the asides don't add up to much and the payoff promises something the movie might not be willing to breach, this is still a bold, audacious statement."

References

External links 
 
 

2010 films
2010s science fiction horror films
American science fiction horror films
Frankenstein films
Direct-to-video horror films
2010s English-language films
2010s American films